The Qoros 3 is the first automobile from the Chinese manufacturer Qoros Auto, jointly (50%–50%) owned by Kenon Holdings and China's Chery Automobile Company. The four-door sedan was formally announced at the Geneva Motor Show in March 2013.  The Qoros 3 commenced sales in China and Slovakia in November and December 2013 respectively. Deliveries started in China in January 2014. A hatchback version made its debut at the Geneva Motor Show in March 2014. A third derivative, the 3 City SUV, was launched in November 2014.

The 3 was designed by ex-Mini designer Gert Hildebrand, and was developed for left-hand-drive markets.

Specification

Both versions are mated to a six-speed manual transmission as standard, with a six-speed dual clutch transmission optional. 

A 1.5 litre turbocharged variant was added in 2021 alongside a CVT transmission option.
 
Qoros is developing with AVL a three-cylinder 1.2-litre turbocharged engine and a new four-cylinder 1.6-litre turbocharged engine, both featuring direct injection, for future models.

The hatchback is slightly shorter;

Qoros 3 GT

A crossover sedan variant of the Qoros 3 was known as the Qoros 3 GT equipped with the 1.6 litre turbocharged engine featuring plastic cladding crossover cues and a higher ground clearance and ride height.

Qoros 3 City SUV

The Qoros 3 City SUV is a compact CUV based on the Qoros 3 hatchback. The Qoros 3 City SUV debuted in November on the 2014 Guangzhou Auto Show. Prices for the City SUV ranges from 139,900 yuan to 179,900 yuan ($22,470 – 28,900).

Concept models
At the 2013 Geneva Motor Show, Qoros displayed concept models of future derivatives; the Qoros 3 Cross Hybrid Concept and the Qoros 3 Estate Concept.

In 2016 at the Guangzhou auto show, Qoros unveiled a prototype of the 3 with a camless engine, dubbed "Qamfree".  The camless engine concept has been developed in partnership with FreeValve, a Koenigsegg subsidiary.

Safety

In September 2013, the Qoros 3 became the first car originated in China to achieve a five-star rating on the Euro NCAP crash tests. The car scored a 95% on adult occupant protection and an 87% on child occupant protection.

Euro NCAP awarded the Qoros 3 "Small Family Car" Best in Class for 2013, and was recognised as the best of all 33 cars tested in 2013.

International markets
The first foreign sales of the Qoros 3 started in December 2013, with the opening of a dealership in Bratislava, Slovakia.

References

External links

Qoros vehicles
Cars of China
Front-wheel-drive vehicles
Sedans
Hatchbacks
Euro NCAP small family cars
Cars introduced in 2013
First car made by manufacturer